The Lantern Tower is one of the three medieval historic towers in La Rochelle, Poitou-Charentes, France, which guarded the port at Aunis. The Lantern tower served as a Lighthouse and a prison throughout its history. It was also known by other names: Garrot tower, Priest tower, and Four Sergeant tower. In 1789 the French government declared it a Monument historique

History 
The original purpose of the tower was to watch ship traffic in the port. It also served as a lighthouse. In the 1500s the tower was used to imprison priests. It was a multi-purpose building: used both as a lighthouse and a prison. The tower was used to watch the Aunis coastline during the middle ages; and it was used to guide ships into port. Throughout its history it was also used to house prisoners: first priests, then sailors, and finally prisoners from the Wars of the Vendée.

See also 
Centre des monuments nationaux
Vauclair castle
La Rochelle Cathedral

References

External links 

 
 La Rochelle et Son Histoire: Tours 
 Église paroissiale Saint-Barthélemy à La Rochelle 
Photos, French Ministry of Culture

Buildings and structures in La Rochelle
Tourist attractions in La Rochelle
Historic sites in France
Monuments historiques of Nouvelle-Aquitaine